Years in Waste is the second album from Omnium Gatherum. It was their only release on Nuclear Blast Records.

Track listing

Credits
Antti Filppu - Vocals
Markus Vanhala - Guitar
Harri Pikka - Guitar
Janne Markkanen - Bass
Jukka Perälä - Synth
Jarmo Pikka - Drums

References

2004 albums
Nuclear Blast albums
Omnium Gatherum albums